Anadara is a genus of saltwater bivalves, ark clams, in the family Arcidae.  It is also called Scapharca.

This genus is known in the fossil record from the Cretaceous period to the Quaternary period (age range: 140.2 to 0.0 million years ago). These fossils have been found all over the world.

Species
The following species are recognised in the genus Anadara:
 
 Anadara adamsi 
 Anadara aequatorialis 
 Anadara aethiopica 
 Anadara aliena 
 Anadara ambigua 
 Anadara amicula 
 Anadara angicostata 
 Anadara antiquata (Linnaeus, 1758)
 Anadara auriculata Lamarck    
 Anadara axelolssoni 
 Anadara bataviensis 
 Anadara biangulata 
 Anadara bifrons 
 Anadara bonplandiana 
 Anadara brasiliana (Lamarck, 1819) - incongruous ark 
 Anadara broughtonii (Schrenck, 1867) 
 Anadara camerunensis 
 Anadara cepoides 
 Anadara chemnitzii (Philippi, 1851) - Chemnitz ark, triangular ark 
 Anadara cistula 
 Anadara compacta   
 Anadara concinna (Sowerby, 1833)
 Anadara consociata 
 Anadara corbuloides 
 Anadara cornea 
 Anadara corrugata 
 Anadara crassicostata 
 Anadara craticulata 
 Anadara crebricostata 
 Anadara cymbaeformis 
 † Anadara diluvii (Lamarck, 1805) 
 Anadara disparilis 
 Anadara eborensis 
 Anadara ehrenbergi 
 Anadara emarginata 
 Anadara esmeralda 
 Anadara ferruginea 
 Anadara formosa 
 Anadara fultoni 
 Anadara geissei 
 Anadara gibbosa 
 Anadara globosa 
 Anadara guangdongensis 
 Anadara gubernaculum 
 Anadara hankeyana 
 Anadara hemidesmos 
 Anadara hyphalopilema 
 Anadara inaequivalvis 
 Anadara indica 
 Anadara jousseaumei 
 Anadara jurata 
 Anadara kagoshimensis 
 Anadara kikaizimana 
 Anadara labiosa 
 Anadara lienosa (Say, 1832)  
 Anadara lirata 
 Anadara livingstonei 
 Anadara mazatlanica 
 Anadara muii 
 Anadara natalensis   
 Anadara notabilis (Röding, 1798) - eared ark  
 Anadara nugax  
 Anadara nux (Sowerby, 1833)  
 Anadara obesa 
 Anadara occlusa 
 Anadara oceanica 
 Anadara passa 
 Anadara perlabiata 
 Anadara pilula 
 Anadara pumila 
 Anadara pygmaea 
 Anadara reinharti 
 Anadara rhomboidalis 
 Anadara rotundicostata 
 Anadara rufescens 
 Anadara rugifera 
 Anadara sabinae   
 Anadara satowi (Dunker, 1882)
 Anadara secernenda  - Baughman ark, skewed ark
 Anadara secticostata Reeve, 1844  
 Anadara senegalensis 
 Anadara setigericosta 
 Anadara similis - ark cockle or mangrove cockle
 Anadara speciosa 
 Anadara subglobosa 
 Anadara subgranosa 
 Anadara subrubra 
 Anadara tosaensis 
 Anadara transversa (Say, 1822) - transverse ark 
 Anadara trapezia (Deshayes, 1839) 
 Anadara tricenicosta 
 Anadara troscheli 
 Anadara tuberculosa (G. B. Sowerby I, 1833) - pustulose ark
 Anadara uropigimelana 
 Anadara valentichscotti 
 Anadara vellicata

References

External links
 
 Powell A W B, New Zealand Mollusca, William Collins Publishers Ltd, Auckland, New Zealand 1979 

 
Bivalve genera
Taxa named by John Edward Gray